A value-added tax identification number or VAT identification number (VATIN) is an identifier used in many countries, including the countries of the European Union, for value-added tax purposes.

In the EU, a VAT identification number can be verified online at the EU's official VIES website. It confirms that the number is currently allocated and can provide the name or other identifying details of the entity to whom the identifier has been allocated. However, many national governments will not give out VAT identification numbers due to data protection laws.

The full identifier starts with an ISO 3166-1 alpha-2 (2 letters) country code (except for Greece, which uses the ISO 639-1 language code EL for the Greek language, instead of its ISO 3166-1 alpha-2 country code GR, and Northern Ireland, which uses the code XI when trading with the EU) and then has between 2 and 13 characters. The identifiers are composed of numeric digits in most countries, but in some countries they may contain letters.

Foreign companies that trade with private individuals and non-business organisations in the EU may have a VATIN starting with "EU" instead of a country code, e.g. Godaddy EU826010755 and Amazon (AWS) EU826009064.

From 1 January 2020 the valid VAT number of the customer is a material requirement to be able to apply the zero VAT rate for intra-Community supplies of goods in the EU.  If the customer’s VAT number is not valid, 0% VAT rate cannot be applied.  Companies must make sure that the VAT numbers of their customers are checked. You should always verify that the VAT number is valid in each corresponding country’s tax system, as giving false IDs is considered a form of fraud.

VAT numbers by country

European Union VAT identification numbers

VAT numbers of non-EU countries

VAT numbers of Latin American countries

See also
 EORI number
 European Union Value Added Tax Area
 Employer Identification Number
 National identification number

References

External links
 VIES, European "VAT Information Exchange System".

Taxation in the European Union
Value added taxes
Company identification numbers
Taxpayer identification numbers